Lukas Klemenz (born 24 September 1995 in Neu-Ulm) is a Polish professional footballer who plays as a defender for Budapest Honvéd.

Career 
Klemenz started his career in Fortuna Głogówek. After a few weeks he left the club and joined Sparta Prudnik. After two years of playing in Prudnik, he joined Fortuna Głogówek once again. Next he joined Pomologia Prószków.

In 2011 he joined Odra Opole. He left Odra in 2013 when he joined Valenciennes FC.

In 2015 he came back to Poland. He played in Korona Kielce, GKS Bełchatów, Olimpia Grudziądz and GKS Katowice. On 1 July 2018 he signed a contract with Jagiellonia Białystok.

On 21 January 2019 he joined Wisła Kraków.

On 22 January 2021 he joined Budapest Honvéd.

References

External links 
 
 
 

1995 births
Living people
Citizens of Poland through descent
Polish footballers
Association football defenders
Odra Opole players
Valenciennes FC players
Korona Kielce players
GKS Bełchatów players
Olimpia Grudziądz players
Jagiellonia Białystok players
GKS Katowice players
Wisła Kraków players
Budapest Honvéd FC players
Ekstraklasa players
I liga players
Nemzeti Bajnokság I players
Polish expatriate footballers
Expatriate footballers in France
Polish expatriate sportspeople in France
Expatriate footballers in Hungary
Polish expatriate sportspeople in Hungary
People from Głogówek
People from Neu-Ulm
Sportspeople from Swabia (Bavaria)
Poland youth international footballers
Polish people of American descent